Mark Driscoll (born 1970) is an American megachurch pastor.

Mark or Marc Driscoll may also refer to:

 Mark Driscoll (American football) (born 1953), American football player and college athletics administrator
 Mark Driscoll (screenwriter) (born 1959), American screenwriter
 Mark Driscoll, a character in 90210 played by Blake Hood
 Mark Driscoll, a character in Darkness Falls